Jacob Cardec, artistically known as Cardec Drums, is a Puerto Rican drummer, music producer and composer, specializing in Christian urban music (hip hop, trap and reggaeton) who has worked with artists from Reach Records, Reflection Music Group and Funkytown Music. He has received various awards for his work with KB, Lecrae, Redimi2, Almighty and Andy Mineo.

Trajectory 
Jacob Cardec studied music at the Atlanta Institute of Music. Upon graduation, he was featured as a touring drummer for artists like Alex Faith, Dominic Balli, Andy Mineo and more. In 2012, Cardec Drums got their chance to work for Social Club Misfits with their single "New Years". The following year, he continued to thrive as a producer by winning Lecrae's "I Know" remix contest.

After stepping away from touring, he has continued to produce for notable artists such as Andy Mineo, Lecrae, Derek Minor, Tedashii, KB, Xavier Omär, and ELHAE. In 2018, his participation in KB's Today We Rebel album earned him joint honors with his first Dove Award for Hip Hop Album of the Year. At one time, he used a particular auditory signature of a female voice saying "push your hands in the air for Cardec".

In 2019, he co-founded the independent record label No Apologies Music, with a mission to connect American hip-hop and Latin-based urban music. This led to the signing of the first artist, Tommy Royale.

Cardec has produced for Latin artists such as Funky, Manny Montes, Gabriel Rodríguez EMC, Eliud L'Voices, and the award-winning production with Latin American artists such as Redimi2 and Almighty in Filipenses 1:6, Urban Christian Song of the Year at the Tu Música Urbano Awards, later considered again as Spanish Language Recorded Song of the Year, this time, at the 2020 Dove Awards, where it was only nominated.

In 2020, the desire to merge the two music markets produced an alliance between Reach Records and their No Apologies label, they merged with 116 Clique for the release of the Sin Vergüenza album, where artists such as Funky, Manny Montes, Lecrae, Lizzy Parra, Social Club, among others, creating the desired union that Cardec pursued in the mission of his label. He has continued to produce for artists such as Jaydan, Tommy Royale and Don Ryvcko.

On March 14, 2022, 1K Phew and Cardec launched a project that paid homage to the Nickelodeon and Disney shows/movies they grew up with. Months later, they released a second part with samples dealing with Power Rangers, Arthur, Frozen, Reading Rainbow and Encanto.

Discography

Studio albums 

 2018: Hopetober 2 (with Eliud L'Voices)
 2020: Sin Vergüenza (with his label and Reach Records)
 2022: Phew Skylark (with 1K Phew)
 2022: Phew Skylark 2 (with 1K Phew)

Credits

References 

Puerto Rican producers